Human Race or The Human Race may refer to:

 Human species
 Race (human classification), a classification system used to categorize humans into large and distinct populations
 Human Race Theatre Company of Dayton Ohio
 The Human Race (film)
 L'Espèce humaine (The Human Race), a 1947 book by Robert Antelme

Music
"Human Race" (Three Days Grace song), 2015
"Human Race" (Margaret Urlich song), 1992
"Human Race", a 1970 song by the Everly Brothers
"Human Race", a 1979 song by Neil Innes
"Human Race", a song by Red Rider from their 1983 album Neruda
"Human Race", a song by Jars of Clay from their 2013 album Inland